Struga is a town and popular tourist destination situated in the south-western region of North Macedonia, lying on the shore of Lake Ohrid. The town of Struga is the seat of Struga Municipality.

Name

The name Struga was first mentioned in the 11th century. It is of Slavic origin. and means a "river bed".

The ancient name of the city is Enchalon (Εγχαλών), the ancient Greek word for eel, which may be related to the Illyrian Enchele tribe that was known to live in the region. According to E. Hamp, a connection with Albanian ’ngjalë’ makes it possible that the name Enchele was derived from the Illyrian term for eels, which may have been anciently related to Greek and simply adjusted to the Greek pronunciation. In Polybius the word 'Enchele' is written with a voiceless aspirate kh, Enchelanes, while in Mnaseas it was replaced with a voiced ng, Engelanes, the latter being a typical feature of the Ancient Macedonian and northern Paleo-Balkan languages.

History
In ancient times, the Lake Ohrid region, including Enchalon (ancient name of modern Struga) was inhabited by the Illyrian Enchele and Dassareti tribes. The Via Egnatia ran through the Lake Ohrid region, and is believed to have passed west of Enchalon.

Etymologist Qemal Murati believes that the name Strugë-a was first used as the name of a village; this name was used in a document of Tsar Dusan in the 14th century in the form of Struga. Later, in the 16th-17th centuries, the Codex of Slepçan, the name 'Strugi' was used.

During the 16th century, Struga was located in the Sanjak of Ohrid of the Ottoman Empire. It was registered as a Christian village in the Nahiya of Ohrid with 184 Christian families, 20 unmarried men and 36 widows, as well as 8 Muslim families.

In the 16th century the city was visited by the Venetian Ambassador Lorenzo Bernardo who described it as a city in Bulgaria which was more akin to a small village. He describes the town as an important destination for wheat shipments and a town with fertile plains and valleys, and he speaks highly of the local eel and trout.

Struga was visited by Henry Fanshawe Tozer in his travels in the Ottoman Empire, who spoke highly of the region and the Ohrid Lake which he compared to Italian lakes and to Biblical sites such as the Sea of Galilee, he considered Struga to be a head-quarters of fishery in European Turkey and that the fishery in Struga was property of the Ottoman Sultan who sublet it to locals for a large sum, he spoke highly of the endemic Ohrid trout. According to him the marshes in the region were turned into a habitable region by the Samuel of Bulgaria at the time when he made the city of Ohrid Bulgarian capital. He visited a large local Bulgarian school and mentioned the admiration that the Byzantine princess Anna Comnena had for the hundred of channels, embankments and watercourses in the city.

In the late 19th and early 20th century, Struga was part of the Manastir Vilayet of the Ottoman Empire.

Struga is the home-city of the Miladinov brothers poets who played a crucial part in the Bulgarian national revival and in whose honor the Struga Poetry Evenings are held in the city. Struga was also the birthplace for a number of IMARO revolutionaries such as Hristo Matov.

Struga was the birthplace in 1865 Ibrahim Temo, who would go on to be a doctor and one of the founders of the Ottoman reform movement known as the Committee of Union and Progress.

Struga was part of the Socialist Federative Republic of Yugoslavia since 1945 as part of the Socialist Republic of Macedonia until the 1991 Macedonian independence referendum when Macedonia peacefully seceded from the federation.

Geography
Struga is located in an open valley on Lake Ohrid.  The Black Drin river (Crn Drim) starts at the lake and divides the city.

Demographics
As of the 2002 census, the city of Struga has 16,559 inhabitants and the ethnic composition was the following:

Macedonians, 8,901 (53.7%)
Albanians, 5,293 (32.0%)
Turks, 907 (5.5%)
Vlachs, 550 (3.3%)
others, 908 (5.5%)

The mother tongues of the city's residents were the following:
Macedonian, 9,665 (58.4%)
Albanian, 5,615 (34.0%)
Turkish, 823 (5.0%)
Aromanian, 271 (1.6%)
others, 185 (1.1%)

The religious composition of the city was the following:
Orthodox Christians, 9,197 (55.5%)
Muslims, 7,075 (42.7%)
others, 287 (1.7%)

PWDTFAS-Persons for whom data are taken from administrative sources
Until the last few decades of the 20th century Albanian Tosk, in particular the geographically central variety of the dialect dominated among speakers of Albanian in Struga. The local Romani population of Struga speaks and sings in the southern Tosk Albanian dialect, as does the local Turkish population. Aromanians in Struga also speak Tosk Albanian.

Culture

Struga is also a place of important cultural significance in North Macedonia, as it is the birthplace of the poets Konstantin and Dimitar Miladinov.

The main event of the cultural life in Struga is the world's largest poetry gathering, Struga Poetry Evenings, whose laureates have included several Nobel Prize for Literature winners such as
 Joseph Brodsky,
 Eugenio Montale,
 Pablo Neruda,
 Seamus Heaney,
 Fazıl Hüsnü Dağlarca
and many others since 1966.

There are several cultural monuments in Struga and in its vicinity such as
 the Monastery of Kališta, a few kilometers away from the town center, lying on the shore of Lake Ohrid. It is believed that it dates from the 16th century, with frescoes from the 14th and the 15th centuries.
 Another rock church is present in the neighbouring village of Radožda with frescoes from the 13th and 14th centuries.
 The Church of Sveta Bogorodica (St Mary) in Vraništa, is believed to be where Tsar Samuel was crowned. 
 The church of St. George is also located in the town; built on top of Samuel's church, it has many icons from the 14th, 15th, and 16th centuries.
 Near the village of Radolishta, a basilica from the 4th century was discovered,  with a mosaic.

Struga's old architecture dates from the 18th and 19th centuries.

Sports
Local football clubs FC Struga and FK Karaorman have both played in the Macedonian First Football League. A third club Vllaznimi, currently plays in the Macedonian Third League (Southwest Division).

Economy

Tourism

Much of the town's income is through internal tourism. Struga's location on Lake Ohrid makes it a slightly quieter and more peaceful experience than the more bustling Ohrid.

When visiting this quiet town of North Macedonia, there are a few other places that show the beauty and culture, like the clay chamber pots at the house of the Miladinovci Brothers,  the old bazaar, the century-old churches and mosques.

Before the evenings you can enjoy on 3 kinds of beaches called "Male beach" (maška plaža), "Female beach" (Ženska plaža) and Galeb ("Gull Beach"), located just before the estuary of the river Crn Drim (Black Drim) in its own flow, and between the two previous beaches.

Just in front of the "Male beach", at the estuary of the river Crn Drim it is located the biggest 5 star Hotel Drim in Struga.

Out of the town there is another tourist place near the lake called Biser (Pearl), also a hotel.

Every August the Struga Poetry Evenings (SPE) are held at the "Poetry Bridge" and are attended by poets, writers and artists from across the world. 

Churches
St. George Church – from the 13th century;
St. Nicholas Church 
Church of the Myrrhbearing Women

International relations

Twin towns – Sister cities
Struga is twinned with:
 Büyükçekmece, Turkey
 Mangalia, Romania
 Waterbury, Connecticut, United States

See also

 Struga Poetry Evenings
 List of people from Struga

References

External links
 Struga Municipality
 Points of interest in Struga

 Struga Tourism Portal

 
Towns in North Macedonia